Paul Youssef Matar (born 1 February 1941 in Naameh, Lebanon) was the former Archeparch of the Maronite Catholic Archeparchy of Beirut. The archeparchial seat is the city of Beirut, at the Saint George Cathedral.

Life

Paul Youssef Matar was born on February 1, 1941, in the Mount Lebanon Governorate  in Na'ameh, located in the historic Chouf Region.

On 5 June 1965 at the age of 24, Matar was ordained to the priesthood. His appointment as auxiliary bishop of the Maronite Patriarchate of Antioch was on 7 June 1991 as his appointment as Titular bishop of Tarsus dei Maroniti. His ordination to the episcopate took place on 3 August 1991 by the hands of the Maronite Patriarch of Antioch, Nasrallah Boutros Sfeir, and his co-consecrators were Roland Aboujaoudé, Auxiliary Bishop of Antioch, and Boutros Gemayel, Archeparch of Cyprus. On June 8, 1996, at the age of 55 years, Paul Youssef Matar was appointed archbishop of the Archeparchy of Beirut.

Archbishop Paul Youssef Matar was the main co-consecrator of some Maronite bishops: Youssef Anis Abi-Aad, Samir Nassar, Edgard Madi, Michel Aoun, Moussa El-Hage, Georges Chihane, Paul Rouhana, Maroun Ammar, Joseph Emile Mouawad, Anthony Tarabay and Paul Abdel Sater.

He is chancellor of Collège de la Sagesse  and Université La Sagesse in Beirut as they both fall under the jurisdiction of Maronite Beirut Archeparchy.

References

External links

 http://www.catholic-hierarchy.org/bishop/bmatarpy.html

1941 births
Lebanese clergy
21st-century Maronite Catholic bishops
Living people
People from Mount Lebanon Governorate
20th-century Maronite Catholic bishops